L'Oiseau de Feu, Petrouchka is a solo album by American guitarist Larry Coryell that was released by Philips Records in 1983.

Reception
Allmusic awarded the album with 2 stars.

Track listing
"L'Oiseau de Feu" (Igor Stravinsky, Larry Coryell) – 16:46
Introduction
L'Oiseau de feu et sa Danse
Variation de l'Oiseau de feu
Ronde des princesses
Dance infernale du roi Kashchei
Berceuse
Finale
"Petrouchka" (Igor Stravinsky, Larry Coryell) – 21:56
First Scene
Second Scene
Third Scene
Fourth Scene

Personnel
Larry Coryell – guitar

References 

Larry Coryell albums